The Best Direction Award is an award given at the Locarno International Film Festival. It is awarded to the best directed film in the international competition section.

Award Winners

References

External links
 

Locarno Festival
Swiss film awards
Lists of films by award